Alexey Mikhailovich Schastny (1881–1918) was a Russian and Soviet naval commander. He commanded the Baltic Fleet during the Ice Cruise. He was executed on the order of Trotsky in June 1918.

Life 
Schastny was born into a military family in Zhytomyr, Ukraine. His father Mihail Mikhaylovich Schastny, was a major general of artillery in the Imperial Russian Army. Schastny was educated in the Vladimir Kiev cadet Corps (a military school) 1892-1896. He graduated second in his class from the Sea Cadet Corps in 1901 and completed the mine warfare officers class in 1905.

His initial service was aboard the battleship Sevastopol, transferring to the cruiser Diana he served during the Russo-Japanese War and was interned with his ship in Saigon. On returning to Russia, Schastny served in the Kronstadt Naval Base as an instructor in the Torpedo School (1906–1909) and as Flag Lieutenant to the commander destroyers, Baltic Fleet. In 1912-1914 he was transferred to the Caspian Sea to co-ordinate the building of radio transmitters.

During World War I, Schastny served as second officer on the dreadnought Poltava, and as commander of the minelayer Pogranichnik. In 1917 he became Flag Captain to the commander Baltic Fleet.

Schastny was given command of the Baltic Fleet in 1918 and was responsible for organising the evacuation of the fleet from Helsinki to Kronshtadt  in March and April 1918. The Baltic was frozen and the ice cruise took nearly a month. The ships evacuated comprised 236 vessels and included 6 battleships, 5 cruisers, 59 destroyers and 12 submarines.

Schastny however fell foul of Trotsky and was arrested on 27 May 1918. Trotsky declared at his trial that: "Schastny strongly and steadily deepened the gulf between the navy and the Soviet government. Wreaking havoc, he has consistently put forward his candidature for the role of saviour. He was the vanguard of the conspiracy of the officers of the mine divisions, he openly put forward the slogan ‘dictatorship of the fleet’.”Schastny was sentenced to death and shot 22 June 1918.

Schastny was married to Antonina Nikolayevna (née Priyemskaya) and had two children; a daughter Galina (1913–1982) and a son Lev (1915-2002). Schastny was rehabilitated after the fall of the Soviet Union. A street was named after him in his native Zhytomyr in 1992.

References

Sources
  Biography in Russian
  - the first victim page in Russian
  - Article about the Ice Cruise from Novoye Vremya in Russian
  - Article in Russian

External links 
 Leon Trotsky's speech June 20, 1918

1881 births
1918 deaths
Recipients of the Order of St. Anna
Soviet Navy personnel
Victims of Red Terror in Soviet Russia
Military personnel from Zhytomyr
People from Zhitomirsky Uyezd
Executed Ukrainian people
People executed by Russia by firearm
Imperial Russian Navy personnel
Russian military personnel of the Russo-Japanese War
Russian military personnel of World War I
Ukrainian people of World War I
Naval Cadet Corps alumni